Phillips Brook is a  river in northern New Hampshire in the United States. It is a tributary of the Upper Ammonoosuc River and part of the Connecticut River watershed.

Phillips Brook rises in the township of Erving's Location, New Hampshire, in the vicinity of Kelsey Notch, and flows south through Odell, Millsfield and Dummer to join the Upper Ammonoosuc River in the town of Stark near the village of Crystal. For most of its length it flows through wild country with a long history of timber harvesting.

See also 

 List of New Hampshire rivers

References

Rivers of New Hampshire
Tributaries of the Connecticut River
Rivers of Coös County, New Hampshire